On 13 August 2003 four ethnic Serbs were wounded and two killed as unknown assailants shot with automatic rifles at a group of mostly children who played and swam by a river in the village of Goraždevac in Kosovo.

Event
A large group of Serb children from the Serb enclave of Goraždevac, close to Peja, gathered on the banks of the river Bistrica. As the children played and swam in the river, automatic rifle shots were fired from the Albanian village of Zahač. 19-year-old Ivan Jovović died instantly, while 13-year-old Pantelija Dakić later died in the hospital. 11-year old Marko Bogićević and 15-year-old Bogdan Bukumirović were seriously injured, while Dragana Srbljak and Đorđe Ugrenović suffered from minor injuries. The killings were reportedly timed to coincide with the return of over 200 Serb refugees into the town.

Aftermath
Two days after the attack, Serbian Prime Minister Zoran Živković attended the funeral service for the two killed teens and the Serbian government declared 15 August a day of national mourning. Moreover, it was immediately condemned by the UNMIK, KFOR, Kosovo Albanian officials, the EU, Russia, France and the United States. The perpetrators have still not been identified.

In January 2013, during a period of unrest throughout Kosovo, a memorial to the victims was attacked by vandals.

See also
 2004 unrest in Kosovo
 List of unsolved murders
 Persecution of Serbs

Annotations

References

2003 crimes in Kosovo
2000s murders in Kosovo
2003 murders in Europe
August 2003 crimes
August 2003 events in Europe
Anti-Serbian sentiment
Incidents of violence against boys
Male murder victims
Massacres in Kosovo
Murdered Kosovan children
Persecution of Serbs
Unsolved murders in Europe
Violence against children
Peja